Johnson Charles (born 14 January 1989) is a St Lucian international cricketer who plays for the West Indies. As a wicketkeeper-batsman, Charles started his ODI career against Australia in March 2012. His first T20I came against England in September 2011, and he became just the second cricketer from the island of St Lucia to play for the West Indies (the first was Darren Sammy, who was captain in Charles' international debut). Johnson was included in the West Indies' 15-man squad for the 2012 ICC World Twenty20 held in September and October that year.

Domestic and T20 franchise career
Charles played his first twenty20 match in January 2008, representing Saint Lucia in the Stanford Twenty20. Opening the batting with Keddy Lesporis, Charles managed scores of 2 and 21 from the only matches he played in the competition. Later that year he debuted for the Windward Islands in the West Indies Board Cup, the regional one-day tournament. His performances were not sufficient to secure a place in the team's one-day side, and in 2009 Charles played neither List A nor twenty20 cricket. However, he made his first-class debut in January that year and played eight matches for the Windward Islands in the Regional Four Day Competition. In 16 visits to the crease he accumulated 292 runs, including a single half-century, putting him seventh in the team's list of leading run-scorers in that year's competition.

Charles did not represent the Windward Islands in the 2009/10 Regional Four Day Competition, but in 2010 he returned to the List A side for the West Indies Board Cup, and played his first twenty20 match for the team. In the first match of the Caribbean T20, Charles opened the batting with Devon Smith and exploited several reprieves (Charles was dropped three times and nearly run out) to score his first half-century in the format.

On 3 June 2018, he was selected to play for the Toronto Nationals in the players' draft for the inaugural edition of the Global T20 Canada tournament. In November 2019, he was selected to play for the Sylhet Thunder in the 2019–20 Bangladesh Premier League. In July 2020, he was named in the Barbados Tridents squad for the 2020 Caribbean Premier League.

International career
Having been selected in the West Indies squad for the 2012 Twenty20, Charles opened the bat with Chris Gayle in the third match (he batted after the fall of the first wicket in the West Indies opening match and in the second did not bat as the match was rained off). After building a century partnership with Gayle, Charles (who was described by ESPNCricinfo as having "little obvious pedigree as an opening batsman") went on to score 84 to help his team to victory against England. It was his highest score in first-class, List A, or even twenty20 cricket. The following month Charles was dropped from the West Indies squad to face Bangladesh in a five-match ODI series.
Charles was a part of the Windies side that won the 2016 T20 World Cup.
CPL 2022 form led to a recall for Charles in West Indies squad for T20 WC 2022, who last played a T20I in December 2016. Charles is presently the second-highest run-getter in CPL 2022, with 227 runs in six innings at an average of 45.40 and a strike rate of 136.74.
 
West Indies Senior team Chief selector Desmond Haynes said, Charles would fill the role of reserve wicketkeeper in West Indies' squad behind Pooran for T20 WC 2022. This will be the fourth T20 WC appearance for Johnson Charles. Johnson Charles was selected in West Indies squad for T20 WC 2012, T20 WC 2014, T20 WC 2016 and T20 WC 2022.

Previously he was a member of West Indies world Cup squad for T20 World cups 2012, 2014, 2016. Charles is also member of two T20 WC winning squads of West Indies 2012 and 2016 team. Charles was also part of West Indies team that reached Semi finals of T20 WC 2014 held in Bangladesh.

Accolades
A stand at the Darren Sammy Stadium was renamed in Charles' honour.

References

External links
 

1989 births
Living people
Saint Lucian cricketers
West Indies One Day International cricketers
West Indies Twenty20 International cricketers
Antigua Hawksbills cricketers
Barbados Royals cricketers
Jaffna Kings cricketers
Jamaica Tallawahs cricketers
Multan Sultans cricketers
Nangarhar Leopards cricketers
Rajshahi Royals cricketers
Rangpur Riders cricketers
Saint Lucia representative cricketers
Saint Lucia Kings cricketers
Sylhet Strikers cricketers
Windward Islands cricketers
Wicket-keepers